'Wang Yan (born 1 January 1996; nickname: Helen) is a Chinese former professional tennis player.

On 23 March 2015, she reached her best singles ranking of world No. 359. On 1 May 2017, she peaked at No. 220 in the WTA doubles rankings. Wang won two singles titles and four doubles titles on tournaments of the ITF Circuit.

She made her WTA Tour main-draw debut at the 2015 Tianjin Open where she was given a wildcard into the doubles tournament, partnering Xun Fangying.

ITF Circuit finals

Singles (2 titles, 1 runner-up)

Doubles (4 titles, 4 runner-ups)

External links
 
 

1996 births
Living people
Chinese female tennis players
21st-century Chinese women